George Burroughs ( 1650August 19, 1692) was an American religious leader who was the only minister executed for witchcraft during the course of the Salem witch trials. He is remembered especially for reciting the Lord's Prayer during his execution, something it was believed a witch could never do.

Early life

George Burroughs may have been born in Suffolk, England, although some sources claim he was born in Scituate sometime in 1650. Another source gives his birth date and place as Virginia, 1652. He was raised by his mother in the town of Roxbury, Massachusetts. As an American Congregational pastor, he graduated from Harvard College in 1670 with distinguished honors, where he was also considered an outstanding athlete. He became the minister of Salem Village (now Danvers) in 1680 (where he would eventually be convicted of witchcraft and hanged). Burroughs became disillusioned with the community when they failed to pay his wages, and when his wife died suddenly in 1681, he resorted to borrowing money from community member John Putnam to pay for her funeral. He was unable to repay the debt, and resigned from his post, leaving Salem in 1683.

Burroughs moved to Falmouth (now Portland, Maine), in which he lived until it was destroyed by the Wabanaki Confederacy in 1690. He then moved to Wells, Maine, believing it would be safer from Indian attacks.

Burroughs was described in a reading by Frances Hill: "George Burroughs was confident, strong-willed, and decisive, a man of action as well as a preacher, unusually athletic and clever enough to do well in Harvard. Short of stature, muscular, dark-complexioned, he was highly attractive to women, as is shown by his winning the hand of a rich widow as his second wife when he was a mere village minister."

Accusation and trial for witchcraft

Letters dated to 1691 from the Littlefields, founder of Wells, Maine, and in-laws to Peter Cloyce, and Rev. George Burroughs, signed by Peter's brothers John and Nathaniel, were sent to the Governor and Council to improve the conditions of Wells, Maine. Peter's second wife, Sarah Cloyce, sister of Rebecca Nurse and Mary Easty (or Eastey), relocated to Salem End, now West Framingham.

Burroughs was arrested on charges of witchcraft on May 4, 1692, based on the accusation of some personal enemies from his former congregation who had sued him for debt. At his trial, which took place in May, he was found guilty based on evidence that included his extraordinary feats of strength, such as lifting a musket by inserting his finger into the barrel (such feats of strength being presumed impossible without diabolical assistance). His failure to baptise his children or to attend communion was also used as evidence of his guilt.
He was also suspected of killing his wives by witchcraft, and although clearly witchcraft was not involved, there is some historical evidence that he had treated them poorly.

Execution and aftermath

George Burroughs was hanged at Proctor's Ledge in present-day Salem on August 19, 1692. He was the only minister to have experienced this fate in American history. Although the jury had found no witches' marks on his body, he was nonetheless convicted of witchcraft and a conspiracy with the devil.

While standing on a ladder before the crowd, waiting to be hanged, he successfully recited the Lord's Prayer, something that was generally considered by the Court of Oyer and Terminer to be impossible for a witch to do. After he was killed, Cotton Mather, a minister from Boston, reminded the crowd from atop his horse that Burroughs had been convicted in a court of law, and spoke convincingly enough that four more were executed after Burroughs.

Below is the original account as first compiled and published in 1700 by Robert Calef in More Wonders of The Invisible World, and later reprinted or relied upon by others including Charles Wentworth Upham and George Lincoln Burr:

Later, the government of the Massachusetts colony recognized Burroughs' innocence and awarded 50 pounds damages to his widow and children, though this led to disputes over the division of the award among his heirs. The gun said to have been used at his trial was for a time located at Fryeburg Academy in Fryeburg, Maine, having been taken there in 1808 for display in the Academy museum, but is believed to have since been destroyed in the Academy fire of 1850.

See also
 Thomas Ady
 John Proctor

References

Sources

Further reading
 Upham, Charles (1980). Salem Witchcraft. New York: Frederick Ungar Publishing Co., 2 vv., v. 1 pp. 255, 278, 280, v. 2 pp. 140–163, 296-304, 319, 480, 482, 514.

1650s births
1692 deaths
People of the Salem witch trials
American colonial clergy
American Congregationalist ministers
American people executed for witchcraft
Harvard College alumni
Massachusetts colonial-era clergy
17th-century Christian clergy
People executed by the Province of Massachusetts Bay
Clergy from Portland, Maine
People from Wells, Maine
17th-century executions of American people
Executed people from Suffolk
People executed by the Thirteen Colonies by hanging
People executed by Massachusetts by hanging
People executed by the Massachusetts Bay Colony
Kingdom of England emigrants to Massachusetts Bay Colony
People from Great Yarmouth
American members of the clergy convicted of crimes